Never in Your Life (Swedish: Aldrig i livet) is a 1957 Swedish crime film directed by Arne Ragneborn and starring Lars Ekborg, Ingrid Thulin and Sven-Eric Gamble. It was shot at the in Stocksund Studios in Stockholm. The film was originally made under the title It Happens Tonight (Det händer i natt) but faced major censorship issues, and was eventually released with cuts and a new title. The new version turned the events into a dream, and introduced greater comic elements.

Synopsis
A young criminal plays a major heist and in order to secure information he becomes engaged to the daughter of the nightwatchman. Having carried off the robbery, he proceeds to murder two of his criminal associates and plans to escape to South America.

Cast
 Lars Ekborg as 	Svampen
 Sven-Eric Gamble as 	Nicke 
 Arne Ragneborn as 	Gunnar
 Ingrid Thulin as 	Lily
 Hjördis Petterson as Caretaker
 Margareta Nordin as 	Margit Karlsson
 Hampe Faustman as 	Klämman
 Peter Lindgren as Ärtan
 Keve Hjelm as 	Rabatten
 Elof Ahrle as Manne Karlsson
 Stig Järrel as Fencer
 Astrid Bodin as 	Mrs. Karlsson
 Lars Burman as 	Film Photographer 
 Ulf Carlén as 	Bartender 
 Åke Engfeldt as Accountant 
 John Melin as 	Man Who Can't Sleep

References

Bibliography 
 Qvist, Per Olov & von Bagh, Peter. Guide to the Cinema of Sweden and Finland. Greenwood Publishing Group, 2000.
 Tapper, Michael. Swedish Cops: From Sjöwall and Wahlöö to Stieg Larsson. Intellect Books, 2014.

External links 
 

1957 films
Swedish drama films
1957 drama films
1950s Swedish-language films
Films directed by Arne Ragneborn
1950s Swedish films